Hall Land is a peninsula in far northwestern Greenland. It is a part of the Northeast Greenland National Park. Hall Land is one of the coldest places in Greenland.

History
Hall Land was named after Charles Francis Hall, leader of the 1871 Polaris expedition.

The last live caribou reported from Northern Greenland were seen in  Hall Land in 1922. They were most likely Peary caribou that had strayed across the channel from Ellesmere Island.

Geography
Hall Land is located to the northeast of Daugaard-Jensen Land and the southwest of Nyeboe Land. It is surrounded to the north by the Robeson Channel of the Nares Strait and to the east by the Newman Bay. Hall Basin, the Petermann Fjord and the Petermann Glacier mark the western limits of Hall Land. To the south and southeast the peninsula is attached to the mainland and its ice cap.

The unglaciated Polaris Foreland lies in the northernmost part of Hall Land beyond the Haug Range.  high Kayser Mountain, the highest elevation of the peninsula, is located at the northeastern end of the range.

See also
Sirius Dog Sled Patrol

References

External links 
 The late Quaternary history of Hall Land, Northwest Greenland
Ice limits in Hall Land
Peninsulas of Greenland